Vesicular glutamate transporter 3 (VGLUT3) is a protein that in humans is encoded by the SLC17A8 gene.

Function 

This gene encodes a vesicular glutamate transporter. The encoded protein transports the neurotransmitter glutamate into synaptic vesicles before it is released into the synaptic cleft.

Clinical significance 

Mutations in this gene are the cause of autosomal-dominant nonsyndromic deafness type 25 (DFNA25).

References

Further reading

Glutamate (neurotransmitter)
Solute carrier family